Kute may refer to:

Geography 

 Kutë, a municipality in southwestern Albania
 Kute (Gornji Vakuf), a village in the municipality of Gornji Vakuf, Bosnia and Herzegovina
 Kute (Kupres), a village in the municipality of Kupres, Bosnia and Herzegovina
 Kute, Prozor, a village in the municipality of Prozor, Bosnia and Herzegovina

Other 

 KUTE, a simulcast of KSUT's National Public Radio-affiliated station in Ignacio, Colorado